Manolo Álvarez Mera (né Manuel Ernesto Álvarez-Mera 7 November 1923 Havana, Cuba – 16 October 1986 New York City) was a Cuban-born tenor who flourished as a bel canto during the late 1940s and 1950s.  Despite having an operatic caliber voice, he gained popularity singing in operettas, musical reviews, radio, television, vaudeville, and major night clubs in Cuba, New York, and Latin America. He became a Cuban exile in 1960 after the Cuban Revolution.

Career

Cuba 
Álvarez was born November 7, 1923, to Beniana (née Mera) and Manuel Alvarez in the Luyanó neighborhood of Diez de Octubre, Havana, Cuba. The lyrics were by Gustavo Sánchez Galarraga (1893–1934) and the music by Ernesto Lecuona. Maruja González (1904–1999) sang the soprano role of Mary la O.  He went on in 1944 to perform at the Teatro Lírico Cubano (Lyric Theater of Cuba), singing in La Plaza de la Catedral (The Cathedral Square), a zarzuela by Lecuona. He sang the same work for radio stations RHC-Cadena Azul and CMQ.

New York 
On September 16, 1947, he appeared as a soloist in the musical revue Violins Over Broadway at the Diamond Horseshoes Night Club in New York, produced by impresario Billy Rose.  The show ran for two years.

Brazil 
In 1950, Álvarez moved to Rio de Janeiro and performed in Sao Paulo and on several Brazilian radio stations.

Argentina, Chile, and Uruguay 

In 1952, Álvarez toured Chile including visits to Buenos Aires and Montevideo. His performances were acclaimed by the Cuban magazine, .

In his Uruguay radio concerts, Álvarez was hailed "Sir Hyperbole!" Many of his interpretations, including María la O; Granada by Agustín Lara; and Ay-Ay-Ay by Osmán Pérez Freire, were interrupted with applause, and he was forced to repeat them three or four times.  The night of the farewell, as he went on stage, the audience — more than two thousand excited people — threw a rain of carnations and roses, forming a cloak over him. The program was interrupted for a long time by this emotional tribute.

Álvarez continued his tour to Brazil and also returned to Buenos Aires. He had an exclusive recording contract with Victor and recorded Granada by Agustín Lara and Despedida by María Grever with the RCA Orchestra under the direction of conductor Vieri Fidanzini.

United States 
Álvarez returned to the United States in 1951.  Accompanied by the Carlos Molina Orchestra (1899–1982), Álvarez sang Granada in a short 1953 film Carnival in April released in 3D by Universal. The film also featured Toni Arden, Josephine Premice, and Fernando Rodriguez.  On April 4, 1954, he appeared on the television show, The Colgate Comedy Hour, with Eddie Cantor.  He also appeared at the Flamingo Las Vegas with Freddie Martin.

Hollywood 
By mid-March 1953, Álvarez had been studying for six months with Arthur Rosenberg.  On April 18, 1954 — Easter Sunday — Álvarez sang The Lord's Prayer in a sunrise national broadcast produced by David Rose at the Hollywood Bowl with conductor Miklós Rózsa.

In 1954, he appeared as a featured singer in New York at the Waldorf Astoria with Freddie Martin and His Orchestra.  He also appeared at the Edgewater Beach in Chicago, and the Skyroom at the Mapes Hotel in Reno.  He held a principal role in the production Spanish Fantasy, a show that toured America, performing at venues that included the Terrace Room at the Statler Hotel in Los Angeles. and the Empire Room at the Statler Hilton in Dallas. He also sang on the NBC television program Saturday Night Review, Coast to Coast.

Antioquia and Cuba 

In August 1955, Álvarez was featured in a Tropicana production of Evocación (Evocation) and Seis Lindas Cubanas (Six Pretty Cubans) the latter referencing the six provinces of Cuba (before the Revolution).  The production was staged by Rodrigo Neira, who was known as "Rodney".  The show was presented in a telecast from Medellín, Antioquia, and was a review of nineteenth century Cuban dance and music. Other performers included Xiomara Alfaro, Cuarteto Faxas, Estelita Santaló, Cuarteto d'Aida, Leonela González, the dancers Ana Gloria and Rolando, and the Lago Sisters Trio.

The same production, with mostly the same artists, including Álvarez, was presented in a telecast April 21, 1956.

Hollywood 
He sang to replace the voice of Mario Lanza in the 1958 film, Seven Hills of Rome.

 Final performances in Cuba 
In February 1958, Álvarez headlined in the Copa Room at the Hotel Habana Riviera with Cuarteto d'Aida. Among his last stage performances in Cuba, he was acclaimed for his appearances in the theater as Ivan Marti in La leyenda del beso (1959) and Rosillon in The Merry Widow (1960).  In Cuba, he performed on television, in theaters, on several recordings, and in casinos, which included the Tropicana and Hotel Capri.

Other performers in that production included Alfredo Kraus, Miguel Fleta, Victoria de los Ángeles, Tito Schipa, Giuseppe Di Stefano, Hipólito Lázaro, Pepe Romeu, Juan García, Luis Mariano and Misha Alexandrovich. (On Archive.org)

Other singers included Barbarito Diez, María Teresa Vera, Lorenzo Hierrezuelo, and the group Cuarteto d'Aida.

 United States 
On August 21, 1960, Álvareze was a guest on the Ed Sullivan Show, singing Mattinatta.

 Personal life 
Álvarez married Delfina Cougil Fernandez (born 13 March 1925).  They had two children, Teresita (Terry) (born 1959) and Manuel (born 1961). In 1963, he settled in New York, where he died on October 14, 1986. He had lived at 216 West 102nd Street in Manhattan.

 Selected discography 

 Manolo Álvarez-Mera, Puchitio MLP-505 (LP) (196?)
 Manolo Álvarez-Mera, tenor vocal; Orquesta Bajo, Roberto Valdés Arnau, director
 
 Side A
 "" ("Swear"), by María Grever (on YouTube)		
 "Marta," by Moisés Simons (On YouTube)	
 "No Niegues que me quisistes" ("Do Not Deny That You Wanted Me"), by Jorge del Moral (On YouTube)		
 "Siempre en Mi Corazón" ("Always In My Heart"), by Ernesto Lecuona † (1st on YouTube, 2nd, 3rd) 
 "No Puedo ser feliz" ("I Can Not Be Happy"), by Adolfo Guzman (On YouTube)
 Side B
"Torna a Sorriento" ("Come Back to Sorrento") by Ernesto De Curtis
"Mattinatta" ("Morning"), by Ruggero Leoncavallo (On YouTube) ‡
"Core 'ngrato" ("Ingrate Heart"), by Salvatore Cardillo, 
"La donna è mobile" ("Women Are Flighty"), by Verdi
"Estrellita" ("Little Star"), by Manuel Ponce

 Canciones Cubanas (Cuban Songs), Vol. II, Puchitio MLP-553 & Antilla MLP-553 (LP) (196?)
 Manolo Álvarez-Mera; Gran Orquesta, Roberto Valdés Arnau, director
 
 Side A
 "María Belén Chacón" ("Romance of María Belén"), words adopted by José Sánchez Arcilla, music by Rodrigo Prats
 "Si llego a besarte" ("If I Kiss You"), by Luis Casas Romero (1882–1950) (On YouTube)
 "Quiéreme Mucho" ("Yours"), lyrics by Agustin Rodriguez, music by Gonzalo Roig (On YouTube)
 "Mirame así" ("Look At Me, Well"), by Eduardo Sánchez de Fuentes (On YouTube)
 "Soledad" ("Loneliness"), by Rodrigo Prats

 Side B
"Esclavo libre" ("Free Slave"), by Ernesto Lecuona
"La Bayamesa" ("Women  of Bayamo, Cuba"), by Sindo Garay On YouTube
"Corazon" ("Heart"), by Eduardo Sánchez de Fuentes	
"Habanera Tú" ("You Dance" the Habanera), by Eduardo Sánchez de Fuentes (1st on YouTube, 2nd)
"", lyrics by Gustavo Sánchez Galarraga (1893–1934), music by Ernesto Lecuona

 Por Los Campos De Cuba (Through the Fields of Cuba) AF Records (LP) (1996)
"La Bayamesa" ("Women  of Bayamo, Cuba"), by Sindo Garay (of 15 tracks)

 America Inmortal, Reyes (LP) (1996)											
"La Bayamesa" ("Women  of Bayamo, Cuba"), by Sindo Garay (of 15 tracks)

 Funcion de Gala (Gala), J. & G. Recordings (196?)
 Live, Teatro Marti, Havana
 
"Elena," by Roberto García Masvidal (of 12 tracks)
"Yo Soy Tú Fracaso" ("I'm Your Failure"), by Roberto García Masvidal (of 12 tracks)

 Manolo Alvarez-Mera, RCA Victor 82-5470 (78 rpm)
 82-5450-A: "Granada," by Agustín Lara
 82-5450-B: "Despedida," by María Grever

 SMC Records (78 rpm)
 Manolo Alvarez-Mera; Orchestra directed by Roberto Valdés Arnau
 2521-B "Romance Gitano," by Carlos Granados
 

 † The song "Always in My Heart" received an Oscar nomination for "Best Original Song," in the 1942 film, Always in My Heart, losing to "White Christmas" from the film White Christmas.  Nonetheless, some critics regard Álvarez's recording of "Siempre en mi corazon" as the best performance of the song.

 ‡ "Mattinata" ("Morning"), written in 1904, was the first song ever written expressly for the Gramophone Company (the present day HMV).

 Selected videography 
 "Genesis"
 Manuel Alvarez Mera

 "La Viuda" ("The Merry Widow")
 Manuel Alvarez Mera

 References 
General sources

 Manolo Álvarez on EcuRed'' (accessed December 9, 2015)
 Article Manolo Alvarez-Mera. Accessed: August 19, 2011
 Manolo Alvarez Mera's photo, courtesy University of Miami

Notes

Inline citations

1923 births
1986 deaths
People from Havana
20th-century Cuban male singers
Cuban operatic tenors
Cuban classical musicians
Cuban male musical theatre actors
Metro-Goldwyn-Mayer contract players
Opera crossover singers
RCA Victor artists
Traditional pop music singers
20th-century classical musicians
Cuban exiles
Cuban expatriates in the United States